Anthony Collins may refer to:
 Anthony Collins (philosopher) (1676–1729), English philosopher and deist
 Anthony Collins (American football) (born 1985), American football player
 Anthony Collins (composer) (1893–1963), British film score composer and conductor
 Anthony Collins (cricketer) (born 1949), New Zealand cricketer
 Anthony Collins (judge) (born 1960), Irish judge
 Anthony G. Collins (born 1949), Australian-American academic administrator

See also
Antony Collins (disambiguation)
Tony Collins (disambiguation)